Alauddin (born 7 July 1976) is a Pakistani former cricketer. He played seven first-class matches for Pakistan National Shipping Corporation cricket team between 1993/94 and 1995/96.

See also
 List of Pakistan National Shipping Corporation cricketers

References

External links
 

1976 births
Living people
Pakistani cricketers
Pakistan National Shipping Corporation cricketers
Cricketers from Lahore